Salomé Paulo Afonso Afonso (born 19 November 1997) is a Portuguese athlete. She competed in the women's 1500 metres event at the 2020 Summer Olympics.

References

External links
 

1997 births
Living people
Athletes from Lisbon
Portuguese female middle-distance runners
Athletes (track and field) at the 2020 Summer Olympics
Olympic athletes of Portugal